

Results

Campeonato da 1ª Divisão do Futebol seasons
Macau
Macau
1